Negev Mountains is a mountainous area in the north-western part of the Negev desert, in Israel. Mount Ramon is the summit of Negev Mountains and the highest point in southern Israel, reaching .

Most of the area belongs to Negev Mountains Nature Reserve, the largest reserve in Israel. Its area is about 1,045,000 dunam.

List of peaks 
List of peaks, sorted by height above sea level:

References 

Negev